Faruk Kaiser (6 June 1918 – 10 November 1987) was an Urdu poet and a renowned lyricist in India, making a significant contribution to the success of many Bollywood films. He was one of the dominating forces of music in Indian Cinema during the 1950s through the 1980s.  He contributed to more than 115 movies and 390 songs.

Early life

Faruk Kaiser was born in 1918 into a jeweller's family. He was to be the second eldest of 12 children and was educated in Bombay (present day Mumbai). Faruk had an enquiring mind and, even as a child, exhibited a keen interest in reading- books and newspapers - and later in the wireless.
Faruk's mother died when he was 18; shortly after that he left his family home and found lodgings in a friend's tailoring premises. Here, he devoted his time to further learning: immersing himself in poetry, literature, educational books, newspapers, magazines, and almost anything available in print - whilst also learning languages besides his native Urdu.

His Move Into Bollywood

Faruk's love for poetry and his friendship with neighbour Kamran Khan (father of Farah Khan and Sajid Khan) were instrumental in his developing an enthusiasm for the creative works of Hindi Cinema. While Kamran Khan produced and acted in films, Faruk was introduced into the Bollywood scene as an assistant director, whose expertise was frequently sought to modify dialogues and revamp scenes. He went on to direct several movies until he found his niche as a lyricist.

Personal life

Among his many colleagues in the film industry, Faruk was a great friend of actor Kamal Mohan, who was the father of six sons and one daughter. Kamal Mohan proposed his daughter Aisha's hand in marriage to his dear friend and confidant Faruk- who took an immediate liking for her.
During their courtship, he penned the lyrics of Sari Sari Raat Teri Yaad Sataye for the movie Aji Bas Shukriya (1958) while she was stricken with tuberculosis and hospitalised in Bombay for a year.
Soon after Aisha's discharge from hospital in 1959, they married and moved to Bandra. Faruk's career had developed and his work took him all over India; during his many travels he wrote diligently to his wife and soulmate. It was during his travels, on a shoot in 1963, that he wrote the song Oee Ma Oee Ma Yeh Kya Ho Gaya for the movie Parasmani (1963)

Faruk and Aisha had three children-
one son, Shakil (1960)
and two daughters - Bilkis Whelan (1962 -2003) and Tabassum (1963-1983).

Awards
A revered Bollywood lyricist, and a member of the Indian Performing Rights Society, Faruk Kaiser's laurels include -but not limited to-

 The Golden Disc to commemorate the 500,000 Unit Record Sale of the Sound Track of the film Qurbani in 1980 (Polydor)
 Double Platinum Disc for the movie Khudgarz in 1987 (Venus India Ltd)
 Double Platinum Disc for the movie Kudrat Ka Kanoon (Super Cassettes Industries Pvt Ltd)
 Platinum Disc for the movie Bhagwan Dada (Super Cassettes Industries Pvt. Ltd.)
 Platinum Disc for the movie Insaaf in 1987  (Venus India Ltd)
 Platinum Disc in recognition of outstanding sales performance (Gramophone Records and Tapes India Ltd.)
 Platinum Disc for Bappi's Music Lover in 1985 (Music India Ltd)

Notable Works

Some of Faruk Kaiser's writings include the following songs:

References

External links
http://www.iprs.org/cms/Home.aspx  Indian Performing Rights Society
https://web.archive.org/web/20180803151910/http://www.iprs.org/cms/Membership/Members.aspx

http://hindigeetmala.net/lyricist/farooq_qaisar.php Hindi Geet Mala
http://myswar.com/artist/farooq-qaiser 
https://www.lyricsbogie.com/lyricist/farooq-qaiser Lyrics Bogie
http://www.hindilyrics.net/lyrics/by-lyricist-Farooq%20Kaiser.html

1918 births
1987 deaths
Indian male poets
20th-century Indian Muslims
Indian lyricists
20th-century Indian poets
Indian songwriters
Poets from Maharashtra
20th-century Indian male writers
Urdu-language poets from India